Dominik Bieler (born 24 September 2001) is a Swiss racing cyclist, who competes on the road and track.

Major results
2018
 2nd Omnium, National Junior Track Championships
2019
 2nd Road race, National Junior Road Championships
 10th Trofeo Comune di Vertova
2020
 3rd  Team pursuit, UEC European Track Championships

References

External links

2001 births
Living people
Swiss male cyclists
Swiss track cyclists